Patrick Francis Murphy (circa 1858 - November 24, 1931) was the owner of the Mark Cross Company in Manhattan, New York City, and was a legislator in Massachusetts.

His daughter Esther was married to John Strachey and Chester Alan Arthur III, grandson of President Chester Alan Arthur.

See also
 Gerald Murphy, son of Patrick
 1878 Massachusetts legislature

References

Further reading
 Calvin Tomkins. Living Well Is the Best Revenge. The New Yorker, July 20, 1962

1858 births
1931 deaths
Members of the Massachusetts House of Representatives